William S. Hooser was a brief early American silent film actor.

Hooser only starred in 3 films, two in 1916 in The Highest Bid and The Return in which he worked with actresses such as Charlotte Burton and in 1924 where he played the character of Otto Schulz in The Spirit of the USA.

External links

Year of birth missing
Year of death missing
American male silent film actors
20th-century American male actors